Thunderbugs were a British girl group, briefly popular in 1999 who played their own instruments. Their one major hit, "Friends Forever", reached number five in the UK Singles Chart in September 1999. Their follow-up single, "It's About Time You Were Mine", failed to reach the Top 40 in December 1999. Due to this flop, the album, Delicious was postponed and ultimately released on minidisc in the UK, and on CD in continental Europe in 2000.

Members of the group
Jane Vaughan: lead vocals
Stef Maillard: bass and backing vocals
Nicky Shaw: drums and backing vocals
Brigitta Jansen: guitar

Discography

Studio albums
 Delicious (2000)
 It's About Time You Were Mine
 Friends Forever
 Walking On Air
 You Got Something On Me
 You And Me
 Does Your Heart Still Break
 Angel Of The Morning
 Miracle Baby
 Jealous
 Delicious
 Alright Now

Singles
 "Friends Forever" (1999) - UK #5
 "It's About Time You Were Mine" (1999) - UK #43

References

External links
Thunderbugs discography

British pop music groups
All-female bands
British pop girl groups
Musical groups established in 1997
Musical groups disestablished in 1999